José Hernando Buitrago Arango (born 5 November 1970) is a Colombian football referee.

Buitrago became a FIFA referee in 2006. He refereed at the 2010 and 2014 FIFA World Cup qualifiers. He has also served as a referee in international junior-level competitions, including the 2007 FIFA U-20 World Cup, the 2007 FIFA U-17 World Cup, and the 2011 FIFA U-20 World Cup.

References

1970 births
Living people
Colombian football referees
People from Tolima Department